Nesland is a village in Vinje Municipality in Vestfold og Telemark county, Norway. Nesland Church is located in the village.

References

Vinje
Villages in Vestfold og Telemark